The 1997 St. Petersburg Open was a men's tennis tournament played on indoor carpet courts at the Petersburg Sports and Concert Complex in Saint Petersburg in Russia and was part of the World Series of the 1997 ATP Tour. The tournament was held from 17 March through 23 March 1997. Fifth-seeded Thomas Johansson won the singles title.

Finals

Singles

 Thomas Johansson defeated  Renzo Furlan 6–3, 6–4
 It was Johansson's 2nd title of the year and the 2nd of his career.

Doubles

 Andrei Olhovskiy /  Brett Steven defeated  David Prinosil /  Daniel Vacek 6–4, 6–3
 It was Olhovskiy's 2nd title of the year and the 15th of his career. It was Steven's 2nd title of the year and the 7th of his career.

References

External links
 Official website 
 ATP tournament profile

St. Petersburg Open
St. Petersburg Open
St. Petersburg Open
St. Petersburg Open